Live on Arrival was a BBC Radio 4 series of six episodes aired in 1988. It was written by Steve Punt and featured Punt together with Hugh Dennis, Flip Webster and Guy Jackson. The format was narrative-based and featured surreal parodies and topical comment, broadcast live-to-air from the Paris Studio in London. A second series was commissioned but, owing to the start of The Mary Whitehouse Experience in 1989, never made. Punt and Dennis proved a successful comedy team and elements of the format survived in a more refined form as The Now Show, which began ten years later.

The pilot was produced and directed by David Tyler.

1998 radio programme debuts
BBC Radio comedy programmes
British satire
Satirical radio programmes